Callichlamys is a genus of flowering plants belonging to the family Bignoniaceae.

Its native range is Southern Mexico to Southern Tropical America.

Species:

Callichlamys latifolia

References

Bignoniaceae
Bignoniaceae genera